James William Emery Townsend (1838-1900), more commonly known as Lying Jim, was the original of Bret Harte’s “Truthful James,” the source of Mark Twain’s Jumping Frog story, and much more. Some scholars say Townsend “was one of the most talented and notorious liars of the Comstock....” He was a member of the Sagebrush School of writers.

Some “Townsendisms”
Mill Creek is so crooked in one place that it is difficult to cross it. We waded
it half a dozen times the other day and came out on the same side every time.

The Waters of Mono Lake are so buoyant that the bottom has to be bolted
down, and boys paddle about on granite boulders.

Wild onions are plentiful hereabouts, and eaters thereof smell like the back
door of a puppy’s nest.

“When thieves fall out honest men get their dues.” But when honest men fall
out lawyers get their fees.

The editor of the Pioche Record says “Mrs. Page’s milk is delicious.” We shall
soon hear that her husband has weaned him with a club. He knows too much.

Carson Daily Index (Carson City, Nevada)
January 26, 1887
“Mind Your P’s.
Persons who patronize a paper should pay promptly, for the pecuniary prospects of the press possesses a peculiar power in pushing forward public prosperity. If the printer is paid promptly and his pocket book kept plethoric by prompt-paying patrons, the puts his pen to his paper in peace; he paints his pictures of passing events in more pleasing colors, and the perusal of his paper is a pleasure to the people. Paste this piece of proverbial philosophy where all persons can perceive it.”

Homer Mining Index (Lundy, California)
August 28, 1880
“Jim Townsend went to Aurora a few days ago. In consequence the saloon keepers of that burg have ordered fresh stocks of liquors and the inhabitants have imbibed a habit of holding up their hands to their ears with a pitiful gesture whenever anybody addressed them.”

Homer Mining Index (Lundy, California)
October 9, 1880
“A Fishy Feat.
Jim Townsend’s readiness for any sort of an emergency is well known. The way he grappled with one the other day was a caution. Jim Slack, the “Lone Fisherman,” carried him a three pound trout. Jim had four men at work on an arastra, and each one was clamorous for a piece. Jim counted noses and found that if he divided with all, his share would be small. His course was decided upon without a moment’s hesitation. He sat down and ate the whole fish.”

Homer Mining Index (Lundy, California)
January 29, 1881
Under column “Town Improvements”
“The Index office will soon be graced with an L, as we need room in which to store unpaid bills.”

Homer Mining Index (Lundy, California)
February 5, 1881
“Don’t steal The Index from subscribers. If you are too mean or too poor to buy it, come to the office and get a copy.”

Homer Mining Index (Lundy, California)
February 12, 1881
“The Index is a derned sight better paper than some of you deserve.”

Homer Mining Index (Lundy, California)
February 26, 1881
“Washington’s Birthday. The anniversary of Washington’s birthday was royally celebrated in this canyon. Patriotism cropped out exuberantly, and manifested itself so heartily that the full-blooded American bubbled over with national pride and looked on with a watery eye - frequently so watery that he couldn’t see the road. The celebration was inaugurated early in the day by a go-as-you-please procession from one saloon to another, the man who had the most money acting as Grand Marshal. By dark the crowds were ready to celebrate the birthday of anybody who would put up for whisky. Though knives and pistols were plentifully displayed, very few deaths occurred, and these only when a gun went off accidentally while the celebrants were running each other around stoves and such obstructions as a man could dodge behind. Taken as a whole, the day was one which should be forgotten as soon as possible.”

References

American storytellers
1838 births
1900 deaths
Sagebrush School
19th-century American musicians